Johann Christian Kammsetzer or Jan Chrystian Kamsetzer (Dresden, 1753 – 25 November 1795, Warsaw) was a Dresden-born architect who was active primarily in Poland.

Life
There is a record of Kammsetzer having attended the Dresden Academy of Fine Arts in 1771. From 1773 he worked for Poland's King  Stanisław August Poniatowski.  Together with Johann Christian Schuch and Domenico Merlini, he redesigned the King's Łazienki Park in Warsaw.

He also worked for other Polish nobility, e.g., for the Raczyńskis on their Rogalin Palace, and for Ludwik Tyszkiewicz on his palace in Warsaw.

Kammsetzer died, destitute, in Warsaw.  On his deathbed he married his partner of many years, Marianna Manzet 
(also spelled Manget and Manchette), with whom he had a son.

See also
List of Poles

References
"Kammsetzer, Johann Christian," Polski Słownik Biograficzny, vol. 11, Wrocław, 1964–65.

1753 births
1795 deaths
Architects from Dresden
Architects from Warsaw